Lisa Eva Nandy (born 9 August 1979) is a British politician serving as Shadow Secretary of State for Levelling Up, Housing and Communities since 2021. A member of the Labour Party, she has been Member of Parliament (MP) for Wigan since 2010.

Nandy was born in Manchester and educated at the comprehensive Parrs Wood High School and Holy Cross College before studying politics at Newcastle University and public policy at Birkbeck, University of London. She then worked as an aide to Walthamstow MP Neil Gerrard, a researcher for homelessness charity Centrepoint and a senior policy adviser at The Children's Society. She also served as a Labour councillor for the Hammersmith Broadway ward on Hammersmith and Fulham London Borough Council.

Nandy was Parliamentary Private Secretary to Tessa Jowell from 2010 to 2012, Shadow Minister for Children from 2012 to 2013, and Shadow Minister for Charities and Civil Society from 2012 to 2015, with responsibility for Labour Policy on the Third Sector. She served as Shadow Energy Secretary from 2015, shadowing Amber Rudd, until she resigned in 2016 to co-chair Owen Smith's leadership challenge to Jeremy Corbyn.

After a further four years as a backbench MP, Nandy stood as a candidate in the 2020 Labour Party leadership election, coming in third place with 16.3% of the vote, behind Keir Starmer and Rebecca Long-Bailey. Starmer subsequently appointed Nandy as Shadow Secretary of State for Foreign and Commonwealth Affairs in April 2020. Following a reshuffle in November 2021, Nandy was appointed as Shadow Secretary of State for Levelling Up, Housing and Communities.

Early life and career 
Lisa Eva Nandy was born in Manchester on 9 August 1979, the daughter of Louise (née Byers) and Dipak Nandy. Her maternal grandfather Frank Byers was a Liberal MP who held many offices in the Liberal Party, later being created a life peer. Nandy grew up in both Manchester and Bury, where her family subsequently settled.

She was educated at Parrs Wood High School, a mixed comprehensive school in East Didsbury in Manchester, followed by Holy Cross College in Bury. She studied politics at Newcastle University, graduating in 2001, and obtained a master's degree in public policy from Birkbeck, University of London.

She worked as a researcher and caseworker for the Walthamstow Labour MP Neil Gerrard. After that, Nandy worked as a researcher at the homelessness charity Centrepoint from 2003 to 2005, and then as senior policy adviser at The Children's Society from 2005 until her election in 2010, where she specialised in issues facing young refugees, also acting as adviser to the Children's Commissioner for England and to the Independent Asylum Commission. She served as a Labour councillor for the Hammersmith Broadway ward on Hammersmith and Fulham London Borough Council from 2006 to 2010. As a councillor, she served as shadow cabinet member for housing.

Parliamentary career 
Nandy was selected as the Labour parliamentary candidate for Wigan constituency in February 2010 from an all-women shortlist. Elected to parliament on 7 May 2010, she became the constituency's first female MP and one of the first Asian female MPs.

She was appointed to the Education Select Committee in July 2010 and was appointed Parliamentary Private Secretary to Tessa Jowell, the Shadow Olympics Minister, in October 2010. In 2012, she succeeded Catherine McKinnell as Shadow Children and Young Families Minister. In October 2013, she was appointed shadow charities minister.

Following Labour's general election defeat in May 2015 and Ed Miliband's subsequent resignation as party leader, there was some speculation in the media that Nandy would stand in the leadership election. Nandy declined and endorsed Andy Burnham. In August 2015, Owen Jones said that he encouraged Nandy to run for the leadership, but the recent birth of her son prevented it. Nandy was also mentioned in the Guardian and the Telegraph as someone from the left wing of the party who could replace Jeremy Corbyn as leader before the 2017 general election, and after the 2019 general election in the 2020 Labour Party leadership election.

In September 2015, it was announced that Nandy had been appointed to serve as Shadow Energy Secretary in the Shadow Cabinet. Along with many colleagues, she resigned from her post in June 2016. In the wake of these resignations, Nandy was approached by Labour MPs who wanted her to stand against Jeremy Corbyn in a leadership election. MPs felt that Nandy and eventual candidate Owen Smith were soft Left politicians who could win the leadership. Nandy declined to stand and instead served as co-chair of Smith's campaign team.

After the election resulted in Corbyn's re-election, Nandy announced that she did not intend to return to the frontbench without the re-introduction of Shadow Cabinet elections, which had been abolished by Ed Miliband in 2011 (the last election being held in 2010). She also spoke of the abuse she had received for not supporting Corbyn, which she described as leaving her "genuinely frightened". She compared her treatment to that which she had received at the hands of the far-right when she first campaigned to become MP for Wigan in 2010.

In 2018, Nandy set up the Centre for Towns, with data analytics expert Ian Warren. The Centre for Towns bills itself as an "independent non-partisan organisation dedicated to providing research and analysis of our towns". At the end of 2018 Nandy became the chair of Labour Friends of Palestine and the Middle East.

2020 leadership election 

In January 2020, Nandy wrote a letter to the Wigan Post outlining her intention to stand to succeed Jeremy Corbyn in the 2020 leadership election, saying that she wanted to "bring Labour home" to its traditional strongholds.

On 16 January 2020, during the Labour leadership election, Nandy said that demands for Scottish independence could be overcome with a "social justice agenda", saying that there were times in the past when that had quelled nationalist movements in Catalonia and Quebec. She was criticised by several Scottish National Party politicians, who pointed to police violence and the jailing of politicians during the 2017 Catalan independence referendum to refute her point. In a blog post, Nandy said that police violence in Catalonia was unjustified, and that socialists opposed to separatism "may yet win out".

On 21 January 2020, Lisa Nandy was endorsed by the GMB union, which praised her "ambition, optimism, and decisive leadership". In February, she won the endorsement of the Jewish Labour Movement, receiving the backing of 51% of JLM members.

Nandy came third in the contest, receiving 79,597 votes (16.2% of the vote share).

Shadow Foreign Secretary 
On 5 April 2020, Nandy was appointed Shadow Secretary of State for Foreign and Commonwealth Affairs in the new Shadow Cabinet led by Keir Starmer. Although Dominic Raab became Foreign, Commonwealth and Development Secretary in September 2020 following the abolition of the Department for International Development, Nandy did not hold the portfolio of International Development, which was held by Preet Gill.

In March 2021, Nandy made her first foreign policy speech at Chatham House. Nandy said her priorities would include national security, Russian aggression and climate change.

Shadow Levelling Up Secretary 
On 29 November 2021, Nandy was moved to the newly created position of Shadow Secretary of State for Levelling Up, Housing and Communities. Given that this involved opposing the Johnson government's flagship levelling up policy, the move was described as a promotion. She was critical of the Levelling Up White Paper.

Political positions 
Politico has stated that she is on the "centre left" of the Labour party, and is a "clear break from Corbynism, and Paul Bristow has said that Nandy is "refreshingly untribal". Jon Cruddas has stated that Nandy is on the "authentic soft left" of the party.

She has supported Labour's position as an internationalist party, supported remaining in the EU, supported a "soft" Brexit in opposition to a second Brexit referendum, and supported immigration into the UK.

On the Israeli–Palestinian conflict, she supports a two-state solution and opposes the "Trump peace plan" and Israeli occupation of the West Bank, noting her support for the Palestinian right of return, while also opposing the Boycott, Divestment and Sanctions movement and supporting the right of the Jewish people to self-determination.

Nandy supports "ethical interventionism" and states that although she supports working towards peace, she is "not a pacifist". She has also cited Robin Cook's speech in 1997 on "ethical foreign policy" as an influence on her beliefs, and the UK intervention in Sierra Leone in 2000 as an example of ethical interventionism. She voted against UK airstrikes in Syria in 2015, opposed UK arms exports to Saudi Arabia, the assassination of Qasem Soleimani and the Iraq War.

She criticised China's record on human rights and called for sanctions on Chinese officials. She criticised Russia's record on human rights and the Salisbury poisoning and also former Labour leader Jeremy Corbyn's positions on Russia for standing "with the Russian government, and not with the people it oppresses".

In 2019, the International Court of Justice in The Hague ruled that the United Kingdom must transfer the Chagos Archipelago to Mauritius as they were not legally separated from the latter in 1965. Nandy, in a letter to UK Foreign Secretary Dominic Raab said the UK position "is damaging to Britain’s reputation, undermines your credibility and moral authority and sets a damaging precedent that others may seize upon to undermine UK national interests, and those of our allies, in other contexts or maritime disputes”.

On the issue of the Trump presidency, Nandy has said that the UK should "engage" with Donald Trump, to "have the argument" with him. She has also stated that she would oppose signing a trade deal with the US unless it ratifies the Paris Agreement, which the US withdrew from under Trump's presidency.

Personal life 
Nandy's partner, Andy Collis, is a public relations consultant. She has a son, born in Wigan Infirmary in April 2015.

She is a member of the Unite Union.

Selected works

Notes

References

External links 

 
 
 

|-

|-

|-

|-

|-

1979 births
Living people
Alumni of Birkbeck, University of London
Alumni of Newcastle University
British people of Anglo-Indian descent
British republicans
Councillors in the London Borough of Hammersmith and Fulham
Female members of the Parliament of the United Kingdom for English constituencies
Labour Party (UK) MPs for English constituencies
Politicians from Manchester
UK MPs 2010–2015
UK MPs 2015–2017
21st-century British women politicians
UK MPs 2017–2019
UK MPs 2019–present
Members of the Parliament of the United Kingdom for Wigan
People educated at Parrs Wood High School
People educated at Holy Cross College
21st-century English women
21st-century English people
Women councillors in England